A Divisional Commissioner, also known as Commissioner of division, is an Indian Administrative Service officer who serves as the administrator of a division of a state in India. The post is referred to as regional commissioner in Karnataka and as revenue divisional commissioner in Odisha.

Office-bearers are generally either of the ranks of secretary to the state government, or principal secretary to state government.

The role of a divisional commissioner's office is to act as the administrative  head of all the state government offices situated in the division. A divisional commissioner is given the direct responsibility of administrating the land revenue collection, canal revenue collection and law & order maintenance of a division. The divisional commissioner also presides over Local government institutions in the division. Officers are transferred to and from the post by the state government. This post exists in many states of India. Divisional commissioners are responsible for general administration of the division and planned development of the districts under his control and also act as appeal adalat for revenue cases.

History of divisional commissioner
The division as an administrative level came into being in 1829 by the East India Company to facilitate the administration of far flung districts as a result of an increase in the scope of operations corresponding to the expansion of British territories. Each division was put under the charge of a divisional commissioner. The post was created by then the Bengal government. The institution of divisional commissioner was created by Lord William Bentinck.

The appointment of commissioners in the subsequently acquired provinces of Punjab, Burma, Oudh and the Central Provinces followed in due course.

The Royal Commission for Decentralisation, 1907 recommended its retention. The issue, however, continued to crop up again and again, particularly at the time of constitutional reforms of 1919, 1935, and 1947. After independence, the state governments merely tinkered with traditional revenue set-up and the states of Maharashtra, Rajasthan, and Gujarat abolished the posts of divisional commissioners but later revived them except in Gujarat.

Divisions

A division generally covers three to five districts each headed by a district magistrate and collector or deputy commissioner and district magistrate (depending on the state), the number varying from state to state and from division to division within a state itself. Currently, administrative and revenue divisions exists in all states except Gujarat, Kerala, Tamil Nadu, Andhra Pradesh, Telangana, Sikkim, Manipur, Tripura, Mizoram and all union territories but Delhi, Jammu and Kashmir and Ladakh.

Powers of divisional commissioner
While the powers and roles of a divisional commissioner vary from state to state they generally involve-
 Act as appellate authority on decisions of various departments of the division.
 Conducts inquiry reports against all state government employees posted in district and division for state government.
 Supervises crime control, law and order related meetings along with police commissioner, zonal and range police chief.
 Control over revenue administrations in the division and holds revenue courts.
 Ensure proper and effective coordination among the various organizations of the government and public.
 Supervise, guide and control the various offices in the division.
 Coordination and supervision of all the departments of the division.
 Hearing public grievances and its redressal.
 Control over local government and administers the oath of elected functionaries like mayor, zila panchayat chairperson etc. in many states.
 Financial control over the preparation of budget on development authorities, urban and rural local bodies and other departments in many states.
 Writing of annual confidential reports of most of the officers who are head of a department in divisional or district level.
 The approval of divisional commissioner is required for the grant of certain types of licenses for the firearms and extending & granting paroles for various convicts.
 Acts as electoral roll observer and accessibility observer during parliamentary and state assembly elections.
 Acts as electoral registration officer for graduates’, teachers’ and local authorities’ constituencies of the state legislative council.
 Acts as the appointing authority for naib tehsildars.
 Transfers revenue officers of tehsildars and below level within the division.

Role of divisional commissioner
The roles and powers of commissioners vary from state to state but there is a general precedent. The divisional commissioner performs a variety of roles in regional administration. Today, district magistrates are quite junior officers, needing the guidance and supervision of a seasoned administrator like the divisional commissioner. During the British period, a member of the Indian Civil Service was normally appointed a collector of the district in his twelfth year of service. Today a member of the IAS becomes a district collector after putting in five or six years of service. With his insufficient administrative experience, a district collector of today necessarily needs guidance. The divisional commissioners, therefore, are a necessary part of the governmental machinery.

Apart from giving expert advice, the commissioners also provide direct communication with a large number of heads of districts. The commissioner is a regional coordinator. Posted at the divisional level, he coordinates the work of various departments in his division in a way that no other administrative ingenuity can. They are instruments of decentralized coordination, The activities of different departments of the government, especially those engaged in development programmes, though varying in nature, are interlinked and there are often a number of common problems which need immediate attention and resolution. At the regional level, this coordination is brought about by the commissioners. It is only an officer who is intimately aware of the problems of the region and the day-to-day working of different governmental departments at the regional and district levels that can effectively coordinate their working and find agreeable solutions to inter-departmental problems.

The commissioner is the effective agency to supervise and inspect the work of district offices, both police and revenue, to enforce efficiency. The commissioner is a necessary intermediate link between the government and the district administration, shielding one against the other.
 A channel of communication between the districts and state government
 Regional coordinating authority for technical departments
 Provides help, guide and assistance to deputy commissioners
 Provides expert advice to headquarters

A divisional commissioner is assisted by some officers for carrying out day-to-day work in various fields:-
 Additional commissioner(s) for revenue, executive and development.
 IAS or state civil services officers at district and divisional level report only when ordered so by divisional commissioner.

Exception
Most of the states in India have a divisional commissioner system in which a division is headed by a commissioner who is responsible for the overall administration of the division. However, there are a few states in India that do not have a divisional commissioner system.

The states that do not have a divisional commissioner system are:
Kerala,
Goa, 
Sikkim, 
Manipur, 
Nagaland, 
Mizoram, and 
Meghalaya.
In these states, the district administration is directly under the control of the state government, and there is no intermediary level of administration between the state and the district level.

References

Bibliography

 
 
 

1829 establishments in India
Indian Administrative Service officers